Theridula is a genus of cobweb spiders, found in many (mostly tropical) parts of the world. Species vary in size from 1 to 3.5 mm in length.

In females, the abdomen is wider than long, with a hump or horn on each side, and sometimes a posterior median horn. The pedipalp in males is simple, lacking a conductor or theridioid tegular apophysis.

Theridula spiders are frequently found on bushes or tall grass where they rest on the undersides of leaves near their webs.

Species
 Theridula albonigra Caporiacco, 1949 (Kenya)
 Theridula albonigra vittata Caporiacco, 1949 (Kenya)
 Theridula angula Tikader, 1970 (India)
 Theridula casas Levi, 1954 (Mexico)
 Theridula emertoni Levi, 1954 (USA, Canada)
 Theridula faceta (O. P.-Cambridge, 1894) (Mexico, Guatemala)
 Theridula gonygaster (Simon, 1873) (Cosmopolitan)
 Theridula huberti Benoit, 1977 (St. Helena)
 Theridula iriomotensis Yoshida, 2001 (Japan)
 Theridula multiguttata Keyserling, 1896 (Brazil)
 Theridula nigerrima (Petrunkevitch, 1911) (Ecuador, Peru)
 Theridula opulenta (Walckenaer, 1842)  (Cosmopolitan)
 Theridula perlata Simon, 1889 (Madagascar)
 Theridula puebla Levi, 1954 (Mexico, Panama)
 Theridula pulchra Berland, 1920 (East Africa)
 Theridula sexpupillata Mello-Leitão, 1941 (Brazil)
 Theridula swatiae Biswas, Saha & Raychaydhuri, 1997 (India)
 Theridula theriella Strand, 1907 (Madagascar)
 Theridula zhangmuensis Hu, 2001 (China)

References

 
Araneomorphae genera
Cosmopolitan spiders